Pachycephalopsis is a genus of birds in the Australasian robin family Petroicidae that are found in New Guinea.

Species
The genus contains the following two species:

 Green-backed robin (Pachycephalopsis hattamensis)
 White-eyed robin (Pachycephalopsis poliosoma)

References

 Del Hoyo, J.; Elliot, A. & Christie D. (editors). (2007). Handbook of the Birds of the World. Volume 12: Picathartes to Tits and Chickadees. Lynx Edicions. 

 
Petroicidae
Bird genera
Taxonomy articles created by Polbot